Brandon Silent (born 22 January 1973) is a South African former footballer who played at both professional and international levels as a right-sided midfielder and fullback.

Career
Silent played club football for Orlando Pirates, scoring 22 goals in 270 appearances.

Silent also earned five caps for the South African national side between 1997 and 1998. He played for South Africa at the 1998 African Cup of Nations finals.

After he retired from playing in 2003, Silent became a football coach. He has worked as an assistant at FC AK.

References

External links

1973 births
Living people
South African soccer players
South Africa international soccer players
1998 African Cup of Nations players
Orlando Pirates F.C. players
Association football midfielders